Jhosep Ylarde Lopez (born February 8, 1963) is an associate justice of the Supreme Court of the Philippines. He was appointed by President Rodrigo Duterte to replace Associate Justice Priscilla Baltazar-Padilla who retired on November 3, 2020.

Education 

Lopez graduated cum laude with a degree in Political Science from the University of the Philippines Diliman. He proceeded to take up his Law studies at the same University where he became a brother of the Sigma Rho Fraternity, the oldest and most distinguished law-based fraternity in Asia. He passed the Bar examinations in 1989 with an average of 84.55%.

Career

Legal 
Lopez worked as legal counsel of the University of the Philippines for a year before being promoted as chief legal officer of the Philippine General Hospital. In 1991, he worked under former Senate president Jovito Salonga and was later appointed as chief legal counsel of the Senate of the Philippines. He was appointed as Chief City Prosecutor of Manila in February 2006.

City councilor 
He served as a city councilor of the 3rd District Manila from 1992 to 1998 and 2001 to 2006.

Justice of court of appeals 
Lopez was appointed as associate justice of the Court of Appeals on May 17, 2012 and served for more than eight years until his appointment to the Supreme Court.

Associate justice of the Supreme Court 
On January 26, 2021, President Rodrigo Duterte appointed Lopez as associate justice of the Supreme Court of the Philippines. Lopez fills the post vacated by Justice Priscilla Baltazar-Padilla who retired on November 3, 2020.

References 

1963 births
Living people
Associate Justices of the Supreme Court of the Philippines
20th-century Filipino lawyers
Justices of the Court of Appeals of the Philippines
Manila City Council members
People from Pangasinan
University of the Philippines Diliman alumni
21st-century Filipino judges